Ramim may refer to
	
 Manara, Israel	
 Ramim-e Shomali, Iran